Ocotepec  may refer to:

Places
Ocotepec, Puebla
Ocotepec, Chiapas
Ocotepec, Cuernavaca, Morelos
San Dionisio Ocotepec, Oaxaca
San Pedro Ocotepec, Oaxaca
Santo Tomás Ocotepec, Oaxaca